The Australian women's cricket team toured England and Ireland in June and July 2001. The matches against England women's cricket team were played for the Women's Ashes, which Australia were defending. Australia won all three ODIs and both Test matches, meaning they retained the Ashes. After their tour of England, Australia played three ODIs against Ireland, defeating them 3–0.

Tour of England

Squads

Tour matches

50-over match: Marylebone Cricket Club v Australia

50-over match: England Development Squad v Australia

50-over match: England Development Squad v Australia

Test series

1st Test

2nd Test

WODI Series

1st ODI

2nd ODI

3rd ODI

Tour of Ireland

Squads

WODI Series

1st ODI

2nd ODI

3rd ODI

References

External links
Australia Women tour of England 2001 from Cricinfo
Australia Women tour of Ireland 2001 from Cricinfo

International cricket competitions in 2001
The Women's Ashes
2001 in women's cricket
Women's cricket tours of England
Australia women's national cricket team tours